Tord Asle Gjerdalen (born 3 August 1983) is a Norwegian cross-country skier

Career
In his early career, he finished ninth in the 30 km event at the 2003 Junior World Championships. He made his debut in the World Cup in February 2004 in Trondheim, where he finished 67th in the sprint race. He also competed in the 50 km event in Oslo the same month, where he finished 50th. In a Marathon Cup race in March 2005 in Mora, he finished sixth. Already at the 2005–06 World Cup opener in Beitostølen, in November 2005, he collected his first World Cup points with a twelfth place in the 15 km event. He followed up with a thirteenth and a fifteenth place in December, in Canmore and Nové Město respectively. In January 2006 in Lago di Tesero he finished among the top ten for the first time, with a seventh place in the 30 km event. He finished among the top five for the first time with a fourth place in March 2006 in Falun. At the 2006 Winter Olympics he finished seventeenth in the 2 × 15 km pursuit, and fifteenth in the 50 km freestyle event. He also became a part of the Norwegian national cross-country skiing squad. He had been offered a team spot twice before, but rejected both times, as it would interfere with his medicine studies.

In the 2006–07 World Cup he did not compete often. Except for relay events, his best placement was tenth in the 50 km event at Holmenkollen in March 2007. In the 2007–08 World Cup, however, he opened with a seventh place at Beitostølen, and recorded a ninth place in Rybinsk right before the Tour de Ski. He performed well here, with two fourth places, one sixth place and a ninth place, and he ended up in fourth in the overall standings. He recorded an eleventh and a sixteenth place in January 2008 in Canmore, and finished on the podium for the first time. He was runner-up both in Falun in February and Bormio in March. He ended eleventh in his last race for the season.

The 2008–09 World Cup season was more unstable. He did finish fifth in La Clusaz in December 2008, but also recorded a 58th, 47th, and 36th place. In the 2008-09 Tour de Ski a twelfth place was his best achievement, and he ended 23rd overall. A sixth place in Rybinsk in January 2009 followed, and at the Nordic World Ski Championships 2009 he finished fourteenth in the 2 × 15 km pursuit, and twentieth in the 50 km freestyle event. The rest of his World Cup showings that season, including the World Cup finale in Sweden, were poor. He opened the 2009–10 World Cup season with a relay race in Beitostølen.

At the 2010 Winter Olympics, Gjerdalen finished 19th in the 30 km mixed pursuit and 28th in the 15 km events.

At the Oslo 2011 World Championships Gjerdalen received a bronze medal in the men's 50 km freestyle and a gold medal in the men's 4 × 10 km relay, racing the third leg for Norway.

He won the Marcialonga in 2015, 2016 and 2017. In March 2021, he won Vasaloppet, and was noticed for the record time 3:28:18.

Cross-country skiing results
All results are sourced from the International Ski Federation (FIS).

Olympic Games

World Championships
 4 medals – (2 gold, 2 bronze)

World Cup

Season standings

Individual podiums

 2 podiums (2 )

Team podiums

 1 victory – (1 ) 
 6 podiums – (6 )

Personal life
Gjerdalen is the brother of fellow skiers Gard Filip Gjerdalen and Njål Tage Gjerdalen. He lives in Hole, formerly represented the local sports club IL Holeværingen before changing club to Fossum IF. He is known for his trademark aviator glasses, which he chooses over the more specialised winter-sports eyewear of his rivals.

References

1983 births
Living people
People from Hole, Norway
Cross-country skiers at the 2006 Winter Olympics
Cross-country skiers at the 2010 Winter Olympics
Cross-country skiers at the 2014 Winter Olympics
Norwegian male cross-country skiers
Tour de Ski skiers
Olympic cross-country skiers of Norway
FIS Nordic World Ski Championships medalists in cross-country skiing
Sportspeople from Viken (county)